Atwari is an upazila of Panchagarh District in the Division of Rangpur, Bangladesh.

Geography
It has 20941 households and total area 209.92 km2.

Atwari upazila is bounded by Chopra CD block in Uttar Dinajpur district, West Bengal, India, on a portion of the north, Boda Upazila on a portion of the north and on the east, Thakurgaon Sadar and Baliadangi upazilas on the south and Islampur CD block in Uttar Dinajpur district, on the west.

River 

Atwari has 3 rivers.
 Tangon River.
 Nagor River.
 Pathraj River.

Demographics
As of the 1991 Bangladesh census, Atwari has a population of 103906. Males constitute 51.42% of the population, and females 48.58%. This Upazila's eighteen up population is 52,469. Atwari has an average literacy rate of 37.8% (7+ years), and the national average of 32.4% literate.

Administration
Atwari Upazila is divided into six union parishads: Alowakhowa, Balarampur, Dhamor, Mirzapur, Radhanagar, and Toria. The union parishads are subdivided into 62 mauzas and 64 villages.

See also
Upazilas of Bangladesh
Districts of Bangladesh
Divisions of Bangladesh

References

Upazilas of Panchagarh District